Longview Community Church—Saint Helen's Addition (also known as the Foursquare Gospel Church) is a historic church at 416 Twentieth Avenue in Longview, Washington.

It was built in 1929 and added to the National Register of Historic Places in 1985.

References

Churches in Washington (state)
Churches on the National Register of Historic Places in Washington (state)
Neoclassical architecture in Washington (state)
Churches completed in 1929
Buildings and structures in Cowlitz County, Washington
National Register of Historic Places in Cowlitz County, Washington
Neoclassical church buildings in the United States